Nina Ovcharenco (born 7 August 1984) is a road cyclist from Ukraine. She represented her nation at the 2005 UCI Road World Championships, 2009 UCI Road World Championships and 2010 UCI Road World Championships.

References

External links
 profile at Procyclingstats.com

1984 births
Ukrainian female cyclists
Living people
Place of birth missing (living people)